Gregor Režonja (born 15 January 1981) is a Slovenian football midfielder who plays for SV Suddendorf-Samern.

External links
Player profile at PrvaLiga 

1981 births
Living people
Slovenian footballers
Association football midfielders
NK Ljubljana players
Slovenian expatriate footballers
Slovenian expatriate sportspeople in Greece
Expatriate footballers in Greece
Panetolikos F.C. players
NK Celje players
NK Krka players
Slovenian PrvaLiga players
NK Aluminij players
NK Svoboda Ljubljana players
Slovenian expatriate sportspeople in Austria
Expatriate footballers in Austria
Slovenian expatriate sportspeople in Germany
Expatriate footballers in Germany